Pętkowice  is a village in the administrative district of Gmina Bałtów, within Ostrowiec County, Świętokrzyskie Voivodeship, in south-central Poland.

The village has a population of 200.

References

Villages in Ostrowiec County
Sandomierz Voivodeship
Radom Governorate
Kielce Voivodeship (1919–1939)